The Northern Arizona Prospectors were an American soccer team, founded in 1998. The team was a member of the United Soccer Leagues Premier Development League (PDL), the fourth tier of the American Soccer Pyramid.  They only lasted that season, and folded shortly thereafter

The Rebels played their home games at Bradshaw Mountain High School in the city of Prescott Valley, Arizona, 55 miles south of Flagstaff, Arizona.

Year-by-year

Soccer clubs in Arizona
Defunct Premier Development League teams
1998 establishments in Arizona
1998 disestablishments in Arizona